Érard de la Marck (31 May 1472 – 18 March 1538) was prince-bishop of Liège from 1506 till 1538.

Life
Érard was also lord of Jametz, bishop of Chartres (1507–1525) and archbishop of Valencia (1520–1538). He was nominated Cardinal in 1520. He first tried to obtain protection from the King of France and finally allied with the emperor. He succeeded in securing peace in the prince-bishopric during his whole reign.

His reign is considered as the most flourishing of the Bishopric of Liège.  He reconstructed the prince-bishop's palace, ruined by the wars of the last century with Burgundy. He also restored many monuments, including Saint Martin collegiate church.

See also

List of bishops and prince-bishops of Liège
List of bishops of Chartres

Notes

External links and additional sources
 (for Chronology of Bishops) 
 (for Chronology of Bishops) 
Biography

1472 births
1538 deaths
People from Sedan, Ardennes
Erard
Prince-Bishops of Liège
16th-century Roman Catholic bishops in the Holy Roman Empire
Bishops of Chartres
Belgian cardinals
Archbishops of Valencia
16th-century French Roman Catholic bishops